"Diventerai Una Star" is the second single from Finley's Album Tutto è Possibile and it was released in May 2006. The song is written by the all band and it was produced by Claudio Cecchetto. It became a Summer Hit, and it was used also by a television spot. The single have reached the fifteenth position of best-selling single in Italy in May 2006.

Track listing
 Diventerai Una Star
 Ray Of Light (live)
 Grief (live)
 Tutto è Possibile (live)
 Run Away (strumental)

Formation
Marco Pedretti - Lead vocals.
Carmine Ruggiero - Guitars & Vocals.
Stefano Mantegazza - Bass & Vocals.
Danilo Calvio - Drums & Vocals.

2006 singles
2006 songs
EMI Records singles
Finley (band) songs